This is a list of Indian football transfers in the summer transfer window 2013 by club. Only transfers of the I-League are included.

Transfers

Bengaluru FC

Out:

 
 

 

 

 
 
 
 

Out:

Churchill Brothers

In:

 

 
 

Out:

Dempo

In:

 

Out:

East Bengal

In:

 
 
 

Out:

Mohammedan

In:

 

 

Out:

Mohun Bagan

In:

 
 

Out:

Mumbai

In:

 
 

Out:

Mumbai Tigers

In:

 

 

 
 

Out:

Pailan Arrows

In:

Out:

Prayag United

In:

Out:

Pune

In:

Out:

Rangdajied United

In:

 

Out:

Salgaocar

In:

 

Out:

Shillong Lajong

In:

 
 

Out:

Sporting Goa

In:

 

Out:

References

Transfers Summer 2013
Indian
Lists of I-League transfers